G. William Diamond (born 1945) is an American Democratic politician, educator, small business owner, legislator and former Maine Secretary of State. Diamond currently serves in the Maine Senate representing Senate District 26, which comprises the towns of Windham, Raymond, Standish, Casco, Baldwin and Frye Island.

Diamond served in the Maine House of Representatives from 1977 to 1982, was the Maine Secretary of State from 1989 to 1997, and has served in the Maine Senate from 1982 to 1986, from 2004 to 2012 and from 2018 to the present. He was a teacher in the Windham and Raymond school systems for 18 years and was the superintendent and director of governmental relations for the controversial Élan School in Poland, Maine.

Early life and education
Diamond was born in 1945. He received a bachelor's degree from Gorham State Teachers' College in 1968 and a master's degree in education administration from the same institution in 1972. He was a teacher and principal in the Windham and Raymond school system from 1968-1986, and was the superintendent of the Raymond school system in 1986. Diamond has been a business owner since 1980.

Diamond also served as the superintendent and director of governmental relations at the Élan School in Poland, Maine, which closed in 2011 following an online campaign against the school over its alleged abuse and mistreatment of students.

Political career

Maine House of Representatives
Diamond first ran for Maine House District 23 in 1976, winning the Democratic primary as a write-in candidate and defeating Republican Barbara Strout 51%-49% in the general election. He served two subsequent terms, running unopposed in Democratic primaries in both 1978 and 1980, defeating Republican Carole Bean in the 1978 general election and running unopposed in the 1980 general election.

Maine Senate 1982-1986
In 1982, Diamond defeated Republican David Huber 56%-44% in the general election to represent Maine Senate District 6. He won a second Senate term in 1984, beating Republican Kenneth Cole 61.5%-38.5%.

Secretary of State
Diamond was first elected Secretary of State by the 114th Maine House of Representatives on December 7, 1988. Diamond was nominated along with Stephen M. Zirnkilton and received 115 House votes to Zirnkilton's 62. Diamond's first two-year term as Secretary of State began in 1989 under Governor John R. McKernan Jr.

In 1993, Diamond faced criticism for his response to a ballot-tampering accusation directed toward an assistant to then-House Majority Leader John L. Martin. The incident is credited with contributing to the establishment of term limits for Maine legislators later in 1993.

Diamond entered the race for Maine's 1st congressional district in 1994 but lost the Democratic primary election. He remained Secretary of State until 1997 under Governor Angus King.

Maine Senate 2004-2012, 2014-
Diamond again ran for the Senate District 12 seat in 2004. He ran unopposed in the Democratic primary and defeated Republican Joseph Bruno 55%-45% in the general election. He was re-elected in 2006, 2008, and 2010 before reaching his term limit.

In 2014, Diamond again sought the Senate District 26 seat, ran unopposed in the Democratic primary and defeated Republican Kaile Warren 63%-37% in the general election. He was re-elected in 2016, 2018 and 2020.

Personal life
Diamond and his wife, Jane Diamond, live in Windham. They have two adult daughters and eight grandchildren. In 2012, Diamond published The Evil and the Innocent, a compilation of true crime stories about perpetrators and victims of child sexual abuse.

Diamond has been the co-founder and president of Windham Neighbors Helping Neighbors since 2007 and serves on the board of directors for the Maine State Society for the Protection of Animals and for Hospice of Southern Maine.

Electoral record

Maine House

Maine Senate

(Diamond served as the Maine Secretary of State from 1989 to 1997.)

References

External links
Maine Senate Democrats: Bill Diamond
Portland Press Herald op ed: "Sen. Bill Diamond: Maine judiciary is something we can all be proud of"
The Evil and the Innocent on Goodreads

1945 births
Schoolteachers from Maine
Living people
Democratic Party Maine state senators
Democratic Party members of the Maine House of Representatives
People from Windham, Maine
Secretaries of State of Maine
University of New England (United States) alumni
University of Southern Maine alumni
21st-century American politicians